Crook Township is one of twelve townships in Hamilton County, Illinois, USA.  As of the 2010 census, its population was 312 and it contained 182 housing units.

Geography

Unincorporated towns
 Thackeray at 
 Thurber at 
(This list is based on USGS data and may include former settlements.)

Extinct towns
 Jamestown at 
 Logansport at 
(These towns are listed as "historical" by the USGS.)

Cemeteries
The township contains these seven cemeteries: Arterberry, Hopkins, Munsell, New Hope, Old Brush Harbor, Prince and Webb.

Major highways
  Illinois Route 14

Lakes
 L P Dolan Lake

Demographics

School districts
 Hamilton County Community Unit School District 10
 Norris City-Omaha-Enfield Community Unit School District 3

Political districts
 Illinois's 19th congressional district
 State House District 117
 State House District 118
 State Senate District 59

References
 United States Census Bureau 2008 TIGER/Line Shapefiles
 
 United States National Atlas

External links
 Hamilton County Historical Society
 City-Data.com
 Illinois State Archives
 Township Officials of Illinois

Townships in Hamilton County, Illinois
Mount Vernon, Illinois micropolitan area
Townships in Illinois
1885 establishments in Illinois